Sleelatahanir Pore is a 2021 Bengali social drama film directed by Reshmi Mitra and produced by SK Sahid Imam. The film featuring Soumitra Chatterjee, Rahul Banerjee, Abhishek Chatterjee and Moubani Sorcar, is based on a novel of the same name by the Bengali poet Mallika Sengupta. The film about a rape victim survivor was released on 12 March 2021 under the banner of Sonam Movies.

Plot
The movie is based on the struggle of a rape victim Ricky Sen. Ricky, a young lady works in a Band. In a get together inside the jungle, she was raped by a powerful person Bijon. Bijon is the husband of Mandira Roy, a political and woman activist. Ricky's friend Sanglap, Shuveccha and a journalist try to give her justice but the issue becomes highly political due to Bijon's wife.

Cast
 Soumitra Chatterjee
 Rahul Banerjee as Sanglap
 Abhishek Chatterjee as Bijon
 Moubani Sorcar as Shuveccha
 Shubham Imam
 Sreela Majumdar as Mandira
 Devlina Kumar as Ricky
 Ishaan S Mazumder
 Rayati Bhattacharya
 Asim Bhaduri

Soundtrack 

The soundtrack album is composed by  Bappa Aurindam.

References

External links
 

2021 films
2021 drama films
2020s Bengali-language films
Indian feminist films
Bengali-language Indian films
Films about rape in India
Films about social issues in India
Films based on Indian novels
Indian drama films